Ranjha Vikram Singh is an Indian actor and producer. His most notable role was as Rajjo Fauji in the film Heropanti as the antagonist.

In 2015, he also turned producer with his banner, Running Horses Films, for the movie 25 Kille, in which he also played the lead. He featured as one of the lead actors in Fauji Calling (2021).

 Career 
Ranjha began his acting career in 2005 with the film Mumbai Godfather where he performed as the character Ram "Romeo", the main lead role. He has acted in 16 movies thus far. He starred in assorted Hindi language films followed by Souten (The Other Woman) 2006, Aatma, Old iss Gold, until in 2012, when he made his Telugu debut with Raghava Lawrence's Rebel. In 2014 he starred in three films, Ya Rab, 1, and Heropanti. He has acted in more than 21 Movies in Hindi, Telugu, Punjabi, and Kannada.

 Filmography 

 Awards and nominations 
 Best action in a film (25 Kille) - Filmfare Awards (Punjabi) 2017 - winner
 Best Actor in Debut Male (25 Kille) at Filmfare Awards (Punjabi) 2017  - nomination
 Best Actor in Debut Male (25 Kille) - PTC Awards - nomination
 Best Actor in Main Negative Role (Rana Vikrama'') - South Indian International Movie Awards (SIIMA) Awards 2016 - nomination

Family
His brother, Uday J. Singh, settled in Dubai is married to Shirin Morani, the daughter of Indian film producer Aly Morani.

He has two sisters, married and well-settled in Dubai and Canada respectively.

References

External links 

@actranjhavikram at Twitter
ranjhavikramsingh at Instagram

 

Living people
Indian male film actors
Male actors in Hindi cinema
Male actors in Punjabi cinema
Male actors in Tamil cinema
Male actors in Telugu cinema
Male actors in Kannada cinema
1980 births